Black-striped snake may refer to:

 Cryptophis nigrostriatus
 Neelaps calonotus
 Coniophanes imperialis

Animal common name disambiguation pages